Miss Philippines Earth 2003 (also called simply as Miss Philippines 2003) was the 3rd edition of the Miss Philippines Earth pageant. It was held on May 11, 2003 at the Aguinaldo Theater, Camp Aguinaldo in Quezon City, Philippines.

The event was broadcast by ABS-CBN Network in the Philippines and The Filipino Channel internationally. April Ross Perez, Miss Philippines 2002 crowned her successor Laura Marie Dunlap as Miss Philippines 2003 at the conclusion of the event. Dunlap won against 23 other women and became the representative of Philippines in the international Miss Earth 2003 beauty pageant.

The pageant
The twenty-four candidates that vied for the Miss Philippines 2003 title were formally presented at the poolside of Hotel Intercontinental in Makati on April 28, 2003.

The candidates whose age ranges from 18 to 24 at the time of the pageant, were winners of the regional pageants held in the Cordillera Administrative Region, Ilocos Region, Central Luzon, Southern Tagalog, Bicol Region, Western Visayas, Central Visayas, Eastern Visayas, Western Mindanao, Northern Mindanao and Southern Mindanao, and the Caraga Region, plus 12 candidates from the National Capital Region.

The beneficiaries of the proceeds of the pageant were the Golden Acres home for the elderly, Nayon ng Kabataan and Bahay Kalinga.

Results
Color keys

Candidates
The following is the list of the official 24 candidates that represented the National Capital Region and 12 other regions of the Philippines in the Miss Philippines Earth 2003:

See also
:Miss Earth 2003

References

External links
Miss Earth official website

2003
2003 beauty pageants
2003 in the Philippines
May 2003 events in the Philippines